Simone Cristicchi (born 5 February 1977 in Rome) is an Italian singer and composer.

Biography
Cristicchi won the 57th edition of the Sanremo music festival in 2007 and also the Mia Martini critics award. His song "Ti regalerò una rosa" won due to extremely high marks received from the festival staff (96/100) and popular vote. The lyrics to the song are taken from papers he found that were written by a man who was in a mental hospital for most of his life. It is a sad tale of the man's struggle with being away from the woman he loves and being exiled for being mentally ill. The song has so far reached number 3 on the official Italian charts and number 1 on the official downloads chart going to become Cristicchi's most successful song to date in the country.

Cristicchi participated again at the Sanremo Music Festival in 2019, at its 69th edition, with the song "Abbi cura di me", and scored fifth place.

Discography

Studio albums
 Fabbricante di canzoni  (2006)
 Dall'altra parte del cancello (2007)
 Grand Hotel Cristicchi (2010)
 Album di famiglia (2013)

Singles

References

External links
 A Bibliography In Italian

1977 births
Sanremo Music Festival winners
Living people
Singers from Rome
21st-century Italian  male singers